, hydroelectric power stations in the United Kingdom accounted for 1.87GW of installed electrical generating capacity, being 2.2% of the UK's total generating capacity and 4.2% of UK's renewable energy generating capacity. This includes four conventional hydroelectric power stations and run-of-river schemes for which annual electricity production is approximately 5,000 GWh, being about 1.3% of the UK's total electricity production. There are also pumped-storage hydroelectric power stations providing a further 2.8GW of installed electrical generating capacity, and contributing up to 4,075GWh of peak demand electricity annually.

The potential for further practical and viable hydroelectricity power stations in the UK is estimated to be in the region of 146 to 248MW for England and Wales, and up to 2,593MW for Scotland.

Interest in hydropower in the UK rose in the early 2010s due to UK and EU targets for reductions in carbon emissions and the promotion of renewable energy power generation through commercial incentives such as the Renewable Obligation Certificate scheme (ROCs) and feed-in tariffs (FITs). Before such schemes, studies to assess the available hydro resources in the UK had discounted many sites for reasons of poor economic or technological viability, but studies in 2008 and 2010 by the British Hydro Association (BHA) identified a larger number of viable sites, due to improvements in the available technology and the economics of ROCs and FITSs. However, during the same period there have been significant reductions in costs of other renewable energy sources such as Offshore Wind and Photovoltaics, this has resulted in reduced competitiveness of large scale Hydroelectric schemes in the UK. There are no large scale Hydroelectric scheme planned in the UK as of 2020. However, it is predicted that pumped storage will play an increasingly important role in the UK electricity grid in future years as more intermittent sources of electricity generation come on line.

Schemes up to 50kW are eligible for FITs, and schemes over 5MW are eligible for ROCs. Schemes between 50kW and 5MW can choose between either. The UK Government's National Renewable Energy Action Plan of July 2010 envisaged between 40 and 50MW of new hydropower schemes being installed annually up to 2020. The most recent feedback for new hydro schemes is for 2009, and only about 15MW of new hydropower was installed during that year.

Statistics for UK hydroelectric schemes

List of UK hydroelectric schemes over 1 megaWatt

See also

Related Lists
List of power stations in Scotland#Hydro-electric
List of power stations in England#Hydroelectric power
List of power stations in Wales#Hydro-electric
List of conventional hydroelectric power stations
List of pumped-storage hydroelectric power stations

 Related UK pages
Energy use and conservation in the United Kingdom
Energy policy of the United Kingdom
Green electricity in the United Kingdom
Renewable energy in the United Kingdom
Wind power in the United Kingdom
Solar power in the United Kingdom
Geothermal power in the United Kingdom
Renewable energy in Scotland

Other related
Environmental impact of wind power
Friends of the Earth
Relative cost of electricity generated by different sources
Renewable Electricity and the Grid
Renewable energy in the European Union
Renewable energy by country
United Kingdom National Renewable Energy Action Plan

References

External links
British Hydropower Association
International Hydropower Association
Hydropower Reform Coalition
Interactive demonstration on the effects of dams on rivers
European Small Hydropower Association
Scottish Hydro Electric

 
Electric power generation in the United Kingdom